The Internet Group Management Protocol with Access Control (IGMP-AC) has been designed for incorporating AAA protocol functionality in the existing IP multicast model. It will enforce authentication and authorization of an end user or receiver before joining or leaving a secured multicast group. To add AAA functionality, an access router or one-hop router of the receiver will act as a network access server (NAS).

IGMP-AC is an extended version of Internet Group Management Protocol. It provides a generic client-server authentication protocol, where the receiver or end user will act as a client, the AAA server will act as a server and the access router (one-hop router of the receiver) will perform the forwarding task. Thus, any suitable authentication protocol (e.g., Extensible Authentication Protocol (EAP)) having client-server entities can be encapsulated over the IGMP-AC architecture. The IGMP-AC will not disrupt the usual function of the IGMPv3 (to be used for classical multicast group), and the access control mechanism of IGMP-AC will take place to join/leave a secured or restricted multicast group only.

Internet protocols
Internet Standards
Internet layer protocols
Network layer protocols